Rick Danko is the 1977 eponymous debut by the bassist and singer for the Band. Featuring ten tracks written by Danko, usually in conjunction with lyricists Bobby Charles and Emmett Grogan, it was the first solo album by any member of the group and was Danko's only full-length solo studio album; The other two albums he released in his lifetime were live recordings.

Rick Danko is the only solo album by a member of the Band to feature each member of the group, with Garth Hudson playing accordion on "New Mexicoe", Robbie Robertson playing lead guitar on "Java Blues", Richard Manuel playing electric piano on "Shake It" and Levon Helm singing harmony vocal on the closing track, "Once Upon a Time". Danko handled bass, rhythm and lead guitars and vocals. Other guests included Eric Clapton (guitar on "New Mexicoe"), Ronnie Wood (guitar on "What a Town"), Beach Boy and later Band member Blondie Chaplin (guitar and bass on various tracks) and Doug Sahm (guitar on various tracks).

Track listing
 "What a Town" (Danko, Bobby Charles)
 "Brainwash" (Danko, Emmett Grogan)
 "New Mexicoe" (Danko, Charles)
 "Tired of Waiting" (Danko, Jim Atkinson)
 "Sip the Wine" (Danko)
 "Java Blues" (Danko, Grogan)
 "Sweet Romance" (Danko, Grogan)
 "Small Town Talk" (Danko, Charles)
 "Shake It" (Danko)
 "Once Upon a Time" (Danko, Grogan)

Personnel

Main Players
 Produced by Rick Danko and Rob Fraboni
 Rick Danko – bass, rhythm and lead guitars and lead vocal
 Michael DeTemple, Doug Sahm and James Atkinson – guitars
 Walt Richmond – piano
 James Gordon – organ
 Denny Seiwell and Terry Danko – drums
 Gerry Beckley, Blondie Chaplin, Rob Fraboni and Wayne Neuendorf – backing vocals
 Lewis Bustos, Jim Gordon, Charles McBurney, Rocky Morales and Jim Price – horn section
 Horns arranged by Rick Danko, Doug Sahm and Rob Fraboni

Guests
 Garth Hudson – accordion on "New Mexicoe"
 Robbie Robertson – lead guitar on "Java Blues"
 Richard Manuel – Fender Rhodes piano on "Shake It"
 Levon Helm – harmony vocal on "Once Upon a Time"
 Ronnie Wood – lead guitar on "What a Town"
 Blondie Chaplin – lead guitar on "Brainwash", bass on "Small Town Talk"
 Tim Drummond – bass on "Brainwash" and "Java Blues"
 Eric Clapton – guitar on "New Mexicoe"
 Rob Fraboni – percussion on "New Mexicoe" and "Shake It", vibraslap on "Tired of Waiting"
 Ken Lauber – piano on "Tired of Waiting", "Sweet Romance" and "Once Upon a Time"
 Joe Lala – percussion on "Tired of Waiting"
 George Weber – organ on "Sweet Romance" and "Once Upon a Time"
 Gerry Beckley – acoustic guitar on "Shake It"
 David Paich – Moog synthesizer on "Shake It"
 Frank Laffitte – cover photography

References

Rick Danko albums
1977 debut albums
Albums produced by Rob Fraboni
Arista Records albums
Albums recorded at Shangri-La (recording studio)